is a Japanese jazz pianist and composer.

Life and career
Imada was born in Tokyo on 21 March 1932. He had classical piano lessons. He played jazz in student bands while a student at Meiji University, after which he worked in business for a year. He then decided to pursue music professionally. From 1953 he was part of clarinetist Eiji Kitamura's band.

Imada had his own trio from 1964. He formed Now'in, a fusion band, in 1984. He played internationally at jazz festivals from the 1970s.

Discography
An asterisk (*) after the year indicates that it is the year of release.

As leader/co-leader

References

1932 births
Japanese jazz pianists
Living people
Musicians from Tokyo
21st-century pianists